Best of UFO is a greatest hits collection by the British hard rock band UFO, released in 1996 as part of EMI Records' Gold Collection series.

Track listing
"Doctor Doctor" - 4:27 (from the album Phenomenon)
"Only You Can Rock Me" - 4:10 (from the album Obsession)
"Let It Roll" - 3:56 (from the album Force It)
"Shoot Shoot" - 3:40 (from the album Force It)
"Let It Rain" - 4:00 (from the album Mechanix)
"When It's Time to Rock" - 5:25 (from the album Making Contact)
"Rock Bottom" - 6:29 (from the album Phenomenon)
"Love to Love" - 6:55 (from the album Lights Out)
"High Flyer" - 4:03 (from the album Force It)
"Can You Roll Her" - 2:57 (from the album No Heavy Petting)''
"Pack It Up (And Go)" - 3:15 (from the album Obsession)
"Hot & Ready" - 3:17 (from the album Obsession)
"This Time" - 3:44 (from the album Misdemeanor)
"Long Gone" - 5:20 (from the album The Wild, the Willing and the Innocent)
"Young Blood" - 3:02 (from the album No Place to Run)
"Lonely Heart" - 4:12 (from the album The Wild, the Willing and the Innocent)

References

1999 greatest hits albums
UFO (band) compilation albums
EMI Records compilation albums